These are the results of the women's floor competition, one of six events for female competitors in artistic gymnastics at the 1972 Summer Olympics in Munich.  The qualification and final rounds took place on August 27, 28 and 31st at the Sports Hall.

Results

Qualification

One-hundred eighteen gymnasts competed in the compulsory and optional rounds on August 27 and 28.  The six highest scoring gymnasts advanced to the final on August 31.

Final

References
Official Olympic Report
www.gymnasticsresults.com
www.gymn-forum.net

Women's floor
1972 in women's gymnastics
Women's events at the 1972 Summer Olympics